The Durham Cup Stakes is a Thoroughbred horse race run annually at Woodbine Racetrack in Toronto, Ontario, Canada. Run in mid October, the Grade III race is open to horses age three and older.  Raced over a distance of  miles on Tapeta synthetic dirt, it currently offers a current purse of Can$150,000.

The race was first run in 1906 as the Durham Cup Handicap at Old Woodbine Racetrack. It remained there until the track was closed and replaced by the new Woodbine racetrack. Since inception it has been contested at various distances:
  miles : 1906-1951 
  miles : 1952-1979 
  miles : 1980–present

In 1992, Francine Villeneuve became the first female jockey to win the race.

Records
Speed  record: 
 On Synthetic dirt surface:
 1:48.33 - Golden Sabre (2015)
 On natural dirt:
 1:48.58 - Deputy Inxs (1999)

Most wins:
 3 - Basqueian (1994, 1995, 1996)

Most wins by an owner:
 4 - Joseph E. Seagram (1906, 1908, 1909, 1910)
 4 - Seagram Stable (1926, 1928, 1929, 1932)
 4 - Windfields Farm (1962, 1966, 1971, 1973)

Most wins by a jockey:
 4 - Patrick Husbands (2009, 2012, 2013, 2019)

Most wins by a trainer:
 6 - Roger Attfield (1987, 1989, 1990, 2001, 2008, 2016)

Winners

* In 1990 there was a dead heat for first.

See also
 List of Canadian flat horse races

References

 The Durham Cup Stakes at Pedigree Query

Graded stakes races in Canada
Open mile category horse races
Recurring sporting events established in 1906
Woodbine Racetrack
1906 establishments in Ontario